The World Group Play-offs were four ties which involved the losing nations of the World Group first round and the winning nations of the World Group II. Nations that won their play-off ties entered the 1997 World Group, while losing nations joined the 1997 World Group II.

Austria vs. Germany

Czech Republic vs. Argentina

South Africa vs. Belgium

Slovakia vs. Netherlands

References

See also
Fed Cup structure

World Group Play-offs